Aalborg Chang is a Danish association football club based in the city of Aalborg, that competes in the Jutland Series, one of the sixth tiers of the Danish football league system, and the top tier of the regional DBU Jutland football association, to which it belongs. It was known as FC Nordjylland from 2001 to 2004. The club, founded in 1912, reached the 1955 Danish Cup final, and has played a number of seasons in the Danish divisions, most recently the 2003–04 Danish 1st Division season.

History
The club was founded in 1912 by three 14-year-olds, and had initially teams in football and cricket, until the cricket club split off to become Aalborg Cricketklub in 2001. A tennis department was also added. The Chang football team established itself in the Danish divisions during World War II. The club grabbed the national headlines in 1955, as Chang reached the final of the inaugural Danish Cup tournament, while playing in the third-tier of Danish football. They lost the game 0–4 to that year's Danish champions AGF. In the following decades, the club was a constant part of either the Danish divisions or the Denmark Series, the single exception being the 1980 season in the Jutland Series.

In 2001, former professional footballer Ole Bach Jensen invested in Chang, and a professional team was established under the name FC Nordjylland. In 2004, Ole Bach Jensen withdrew his money, and the club went bankrupt. Aalborg Chang underwent forced relegation from the second-tier Danish 1st Division to the lowest-league Danish Series 6. When former player Per Krøldrup was transferred between professional European clubs in 2005 and 2006, a part of the transfer fee was taken as UEFA-mandated monetary compensation to his youth clubs, giving Aalborg Chang an economic kick-start following their bankruptcy.

Seasons

Aalborg Chang has played the following seasons in the Danish divisions:

Notable former players

Notable former coaches
Lynge Jakobsen (−1994)
Søren Kusk (1994–1997)
Per Westergaard (1998–2000)
René Tengstedt & Jari Pedersen (2006–2007)
René Tengstedt (2007–2008)

References

External links
 Aalborg Chang homepage

 
Association football clubs established in 1912
1912 establishments in Denmark
Sport in Aalborg